Kishanganj Assembly constituency may refer to 
 Kishanganj, Bihar Assembly constituency
 Kishanganj, Rajasthan Assembly constituency